Marieberg is a village situated in Örebro Municipality, Örebro County, Sweden with 1,181 inhabitants in 2005.

References 

Populated places in Örebro County
Populated places in Örebro Municipality